Sergey Darkin (born 18 June 1973) is a former motorcycle speedway rider from Uzbekistan, who was a member of Russia's national team and a two time Russian Champion.

Biography
Born in Fergana, Uzbekistan, Darkin has been a regular member of the Russian World Team Cup squad, finishing runner-up in 1996. He was Russian individual champion in 2000 and 2002.

After riding in the UK for Eastbourne Eagles in 2001, he joined Coventry Bees in the middle of the 2004 season, riding in 15 matches in the Elite League and scoring 111 points at an average of 6.68. He also rode for Arena Essex in 2005 and Poole Pirates in 2007. In September 2005 he suffered serious head injuries in a crash at Togliatti in the European Club Team Champions Cup and was able to return to racing the following year.

He rode for KMZ Lublin in the Polish league, Togliatti in Russia, and signed for Leicester Lions for the 2011 British season, leaving mid-season. He subsequently rode for Swindon Robins in the Elite League.

Career record

British leagues

References

See also 
 Russia national speedway team

1973 births
Living people
Russian speedway riders
Leicester Lions riders
People from Fergana